Nancy May Williams (born 4 March 1959) is a New Zealand former cricketer who played as an all-rounder, batting right-handed and bowling either right-arm off break or medium pace. She appeared in 4 Test matches and 19 One Day Internationals for New Zealand between 1985 and 1992. She played domestic cricket for Canterbury and Wellington.

References

External links

1959 births
Living people
Cricketers from Christchurch
New Zealand women cricketers
New Zealand women Test cricketers
New Zealand women One Day International cricketers
Canterbury Magicians cricketers
Wellington Blaze cricketers